The 1912 New Zealand rugby league tour of Australia was a tour by the New Zealand national rugby league team.

Squad
The touring party included, backs; Arthur Carlaw (vice-captain), James Barber, George Bradley, Billy Curran, Jim Gilmour, Arthur Hardgrave, Bill Kelly, Don Kenealy, Lance Moir, Charles Webb, Stan Weston and forwards; Arthur Francis (captain), Tom Brownlee, Billy Dervan, Charles Dunning, Dave Evans, Harold Hayward, Morgan Hayward, Robert Irvine, Cecil King and Jim Rukutai.

They were managed by Barry Brigham and Tom MacReynolds.

Captain Arthur Francis left the squad before the final game against New South Wales. Francis took up a contract with Wigan, leaving on the same boat for England as Herb Gilbert, Steve Darmody and Bill Farnsworth.

Fixtures
Before the tour New Zealand defeated Auckland 38–16.

New Zealand arrived in Sydney after midnight and only 14 hours before kick off of their first match.

The Combined XIII included five players from New South Wales, including Dally Messenger. However, because the team was organised by the Queensland Rugby League, it is not considered an official Australian match.

The players were scheduled to sail immediately after their final game as the New Zealand Rugby League had organised a match in Wellington. However the players rebelled and demanded a break from their hectic schedule. The NZRL subsequently held an inquest and fined the players 10 shillings each.

References

New Zealand national rugby league team tours
Great Britain
New Zealand tour
New Zealand tour of Australia
Rugby league tours of Australia